Podgrič is a small village at the upper end of the Vipava Valley, below the southwest slopes of Mount Nanos, in the Municipality of Vipava in the Littoral region of Slovenia.

References

External links
Podgrič at Geopedia

Populated places in the Municipality of Vipava